House of Sarkar was ruling clan of Shirvan Khanate from Khanchobany tribe. "Sarkar" means "tax collector", which can give clues about profession of progenitor.

Before reign 
First mention of dynasty dates back to 1721, during Haji Davud's uprising, as he deposed local ruler of Shamakhy who was a member of Sarkar clan. Upon creation of Shirvan Khanate by Nadir shah in 1734, Allahverdi beg Sarkar held possessions of several towns. Allahverdi beg died in 1767 and his sons Aghasi Khan and Muhammad Said khan Sarkar rose up against Hajji Muhammad Ali Khan and started diarchy in Shirvan Khanate. Another brother Agharazi beg Sarkar also mentioned as a ruler of khanate with ancient "Shirvanshah" title.

Reign 
House of Sarkar ruled Shirvan until 1820. List of rulers:
 Aghasi Khan & Muhammad Said khan Sarkar (together) (1763 - 1768 )
 Aghasi Khan (1778 - 1786)
 Askar Khan (1786 - 1789)
 Qasim Khan (1789 - 1796)
 Mostafa Khan of Shirvan (1796 - 1820)

Decline 
Last reigning member Mostafa Khan of Shirvan favored expansion policy which came into attention of Russia. However, khan submitted to Alexander I and was awarded by general-lieutenant rank in 1805 while trying to be independent secretly. He defected to Qajars in 1820, which resulted disestablishment of khanate and full incorporation to Russian Empire. Mustafa Khan managed to regain his throne in 1826 during Russo-Persian War (1826–28) but lost again in 1828 and forced to live in Iran until his death 1844. He was buried in Shamakhy. Some of their descendants became military officers in Imperial Russian Army such as Javad khan Shirvanski.

References

Positions of authority
18th century in Azerbaijan
19th century in Azerbaijan
Turkic dynasties